The 2015 Orlando mayoral election was held on Tuesday, November 3, 2015, to elect the mayor of Orlando, Florida.  Incumbent mayor Buddy Dyer ran for a fourth full term.

Municipal elections in Orlando and Orange County are non-partisan. If no candidate receives a majority of the votes in the general election, runoffs are held between the two candidates that received the greatest number of votes. On November 3, 2015, incumbent mayor Buddy Dyer won with 62.5% of the vote, eliminating the need for a run-off.

General election

Candidates
 Buddy Dyer, incumbent mayor
 Sunshine Linda-Marie Grund, pre-med student at Valencia College
 Paul Paulson, business executive and U.S. Army veteran, member of Republican Party

Results

References

2015
2015 Florida elections
2015 United States mayoral elections
2010s in Orlando, Florida